Kelly Grace Agius Pace (née Agius; born 19 September 1991) is a Maltese footballer who plays as a forward for Swieqi United FC and has appeared for the Malta women's national team.

Career
Pace has been capped for the Malta national team, appearing for the team during the 2019 FIFA Women's World Cup qualifying cycle.

References

External links
 
 
 

1991 births
Living people
Maltese women's footballers
Malta women's international footballers
Women's association football forwards
Birkirkara F.C. (women) players